The 2022 FIM Supercross World Championship was a supercross series sanctioned by the FIM as the world championship of the sport. This was the first season that the championship was organized by Australian promoter SX Global as it moved away from being merged with the America-based AMA Supercross Championship.

Calendar and results
The 2022 season is scheduled to have 2 events in Great Britain and Australia.

WSX

Entry list

Riders Championship

Manufacturers Championship

SX2

Entry list

Riders Championship

Manufacturers Championship

References 

FIM Supercross World Championship
2022 in motorcycle sport